Laizo may be a dialect of:

Falam language 
Anal language